The 23rd National Hockey League All-Star Game was held in the St. Louis Arena in St. Louis, home of the St. Louis Blues, on January 20, 1970. It was the first time the All-Star Game was held at the St. Louis Arena. The East Division All-Stars defeated the West Division All-Stars 4–1. Bobby Hull was named the game's most valuable player.

It was also the first NHL All-Star Game carried live on American network television, airing on CBS.

League business
Clarence Campbell, president of the NHL, announced that the NHL All-Star Game will be held in Boston in 1971, in Minnesota in 1972, and in New York City in 1973. He also announced that the NHL would expand to Buffalo and Vancouver for the next season.

The game
It was the first time the game had been held outside of the Stanley Cup champion's home rink since the 1948 game in Chicago. Brad Park, Bobby Clarke and Tony Esposito were the only three players making their first appearance in the game. Clarke was substituting for Phil Goyette, who had a knee injury.

Summary

Source: Podnieks

Team lineups

See also
1969–70 NHL season

References

 

All
National Hockey League All-Star Games
National Hockey League All-Star Game
National Hockey League All-Star Game